The Japanese name  may refer to:

Places
 Katsushika District, an old district of Shimōsa Province, later Musashi Province.
 Higashi-Katsushika District, Chiba, a district of Chiba Prefecture.
 Katsushika, Chiba, a town of Chiba Prefecture, now Funabashi, Chiba.
 Katsushika Station, now Keisei-Nishifuna Station.
 Kita-Katsushika District, Saitama, a district of Saitama Prefecture.
 Naka-Katsushika District, Saitama, an old district of Saitama Prefecture.
 Nishi-Katsushika District, Ibaraki, an old district of Ibaraki Prefecture.
 Minami-Katsushika District, Tokyo, an old district of Tokyo Prefecture.
 Katsushika, Tokyo, a special ward of Tokyo Metropolis.

Given names
 Hokusai, the artist with the family name Katsushika, born Honjo, Katsushika District, Shimōsa Province.
 Katsushika Ōi, his daughter.